Live Without a Net is the first live album and the sixth in total by the rock band Angel. It was the band's last album before breaking up in 1981. The band had hoped that the album would bring them commercial success, like the album Alive! did for Kiss, but it did not, leading to Angel's break up a year later. The first CD issues cut out the audience in order to fit the entire album onto one CD. All reissues since the 2000s have been released on two discs and contain the album's full content.

Track listing

Disc one
"Tower" – 5:02
"Can You Feel It" – 4:07
"Don't Leave Me Lonely" – 4:00
"Telephone Exchange" – 4:08
"Ain't Gonna Eat Out My Heart Anymore" – 3:27
"Over and Over" – 5:02
"Anyway You Want It" – 2:55
"On the Rocks" – 9:18
"Wild and Hot" – 3:19

Disc two
"All the Young Dudes" – 4:35
"Rock and Rollers" – 8:03
"White Lightning" – 8:35
"Hold Me, Squeeze Me" – 3:28
"Got Love If You Want It" – 4:07
"Feelin' Right" – 5:56
"20th Century Foxes" – 4:45

Personnel
Frank DiMino - lead vocals
Punky Meadows - lead guitars
Felix Robinson - bass guitar
Barry Brandt - drums
Gregg Giuffria - keyboards

References

Angel (band) albums
1980 live albums
Casablanca Records live albums